Robert Macey Talbert (September 23, 1880 – January 31, 1952) was an American politician from Cape Girardeau County, Missouri, who served in the Missouri House of Representatives.  He was a chaplain for the National Guard, the Missouri state senate in 1925, and the Missouri Constitutional Convention of 1922.  He later served as a lieutenant colonel and chaplain for the 35th Division of the U.S. Army just before the United States entered World War II.

References

1880 births
1952 deaths
Democratic Party members of the Missouri House of Representatives
People from Cape Girardeau, Missouri
People from Sikeston, Missouri
Transylvania University alumni
20th-century American politicians